Hendrik van Boeijen (23 May 1889 – 30 March 1947) was a Dutch politician of the defunct Christian Historical Union (CHU) now merged into the Christian Democratic Appeal (CDA).

Decorations

References

External links

Official
  H. (Hendrik) van Boeijen Parlement & Politiek

 

 
 

1889 births
1947 deaths
Christian Historical Union politicians
Dutch members of the Dutch Reformed Church
Dutch nonprofit directors
Dutch people of World War II
Dutch public broadcasting administrators
Grand Officers of the Order of Orange-Nassau
Knights of the Order of the Netherlands Lion
Members of the Provincial Council of South Holland
Members of the Provincial-Executive of South Holland
Ministers of Defence of the Netherlands
Ministers of General Affairs of the Netherlands
Ministers of the Interior of the Netherlands
Ministers of the Navy of the Netherlands
Ministers of War of the Netherlands
People from Putten
20th-century Dutch civil servants
20th-century Dutch politicians